Daniel Mariano Silvani Limia (born 1 March 1986) is an Argentine professional footballer who plays as a centre-back for Argentino de Quilmes.

Career
Silvani spent time in the youth ranks of Independiente and Arsenal de Sarandí. His senior career started with Dock Sud. He scored one goal in forty-six appearances in Primera C Metropolitana, with the 2007–08 campaign concluding with relegation to Primera D Metropolitana. He appeared twice and scored once in tier five, prior to switching Argentina for Spain in 2009 after agreeing terms with Segunda División B's Atlético Ciudad. Silvani soon signed for Tercera División side Ciempozuelos later that year. He remained for the rest of 2008–09, though left before the 2009–10 season started. Silvani signed for Terrassa in 2010.

Silvani scored on his debut for Terrassa in February 2010 versus Gramenet, before receiving a red card in his next game against Espanyol B. Silvani featured twelve times as they were relegated. He spent the 2010–11 season back in the Tercera División with Antequera, with the defender netting in fixtures with Adra, El Palo and Alhaurino. Silvani had further stints in Spanish football with Logroñés, Tauste and Calahorra, prior to returning to his homeland with Central Córdoba in mid-2013. Fellow Primera C Metropolitana team Excursionistas signed Silvani on 30 June 2014. Two seasons passed along with four goals in twenty-six matches.

June 2015 saw Silvani join Deportivo Riestra in Primera B Metropolitana. He made the first of fifty-four appearances in July versus Defensores de Belgrano, which culminated with promotion in 2016–17.

Personal life
Silvani's brother, Gastón, is a footballer. He also played for Dock Sud, Central Córdoba, Excursionistas.

Career statistics
.

References

External links

1986 births
Living people
People from Quilmes Partido
Argentine footballers
Association football defenders
Argentine expatriate footballers
Expatriate footballers in Spain
Argentine expatriate sportspeople in Spain
Primera C Metropolitana players
Primera D Metropolitana players
Segunda División B players
Tercera División players
Primera B Metropolitana players
Primera Nacional players
Sportivo Dock Sud players
CF Atlético Ciudad players
CD Ciempozuelos players
Terrassa FC footballers
Antequera CF footballers
SD Logroñés players
CD Tauste players
CD Calahorra players
Central Córdoba de Rosario footballers
CA Excursionistas players
Deportivo Riestra players
Argentino de Quilmes players
Sportspeople from Buenos Aires Province